The Helios House is a gas station in Los Angeles, California, United States, located on Olympic Boulevard. It is designed as a green station with special features and is considered to be the "station of the future." It is the first gas station in the world ever to be submitted for LEED certification.

The gas station was designed by Office dA (Principal architects Monica Ponce de Leon and Nader Tehrani) in Boston and Johnston Marklee Architects in Los Angeles.  The architects were hired by Ogilvy & Mather, led by Brian Collins. The lead on this project was Ann Hand, and the purpose of the design was to reinvent the gas stations.

The station's roof is designed of triangles made from recycled stainless steel and contains cacti and 90 solar panels. This reduces the energy consumption of the station by 16%. The station's roof is drought tolerant and collects water for irrigation. The station replaced a run-down Thrifty gas station that previously occupied the site.

Built in 2007, it is seen as a Los Angeles landmark. It started out selling BP branded gasoline (at the time, the only BP branded station in the West Coast), but in 2009 switched to its more prominent West Coast sister brand (at the time) ARCO. As of 2021, it is a Speedway Express, a gas station-only brand of the Speedway chain, which, in turn, was a former subsidiary of Marathon Petroleum, ARCO's current parent company, and now a subsidiary of Seven & I Holdings, parent company of 7-Eleven.

Features of the station

Structural
 Made of cradle to cradle recyclable stainless steel
 Farmed wood facade
  reducing landscaping
 Grass planted on roof to reduce the need for mechanical heating or cooling
 Catch basin prevents runoff into ocean 
Canopy collects rainwater used for on-site irrigation and to meet station's water needs
LOW-VOC paint used in back of building
 Signage made from recycled material

Energy saving
 Canopy lighting uses up to 20% less energy than traditional gas stations 
 LED lighting throughout the station, using low amounts of energy to achieve the same brightness 
 Roof contains 90 solar panels, which can produce the energy needed for 2-3 average American homes
 Photocells and timers help customize energy needs to time of day and amount of light

Restroom features
 Walls made from farmed wood and rapidly renewing bamboo
 Motion sensor lights, reducing energy waste when not in use
 Bathroom sinks are made out of recycled aluminum shavings
 Floor tiles made from recycled glass
 Low water volume faucets, which shut off automatically when not in use to prevent water waste

Other
 On-site recycling of paper, cans, bottles, and cell phones is provided
 Maintenance conducted with recycled, eco-friendly products
 Old materials used in construction have been re-used or recycled

References

External links 
 

Gas stations in the United States
BP buildings and structures
Buildings and structures in Los Angeles
Retail buildings in California
Landmarks in Los Angeles
2007 establishments in California